Highland is an unincorporated community in Cinque Hommes Township in Perry County, Missouri, United States.

History 

Highland's name is topographical and was named after a nearby creek.  It is located in the north-central part of Cinque Hommes Township.  A post office was maintained there between 1891 – 1904.

The community has a Catholic church, St. Joseph parish, which was founded in 1870.

Geography
Highland is located four and one-half miles southwest of Perryville.

Notable person
 Vincent Joseph Dunker (1878–1974), a photographer, inventor, and camera manufacturer was born in Highland, Missouri

References 

Unincorporated communities in Perry County, Missouri
Unincorporated communities in Missouri